Laheycourt is a commune in the Meuse department in Grand Est in north-eastern France.

Geography
The Chée flows westward through the southern part of the commune and crosses the village.

See also
Communes of the Meuse department

References

Communes of Meuse (department)